The Stooges is the debut studio album by American rock band the Stooges, released on August 5, 1969 by Elektra Records. Considered a landmark proto-punk release, the album peaked at number 106 on the US Billboard Top 200 Albums chart. The tracks "I Wanna Be Your Dog" and "1969" were released as singles; "1969" was featured on Rolling Stones list of the "100 Greatest Guitar Songs" at number 35.

Background and recording 

For their first album, the Stooges had intended to record seven songs: "Asthma Attack", "I'm Sick", "The Dance Of Romance", "Goodbye Bozos", "No Fun", "I Wanna Be Your Dog", and "1969". "Asthma Attack" was a completely different composition than the version of the song utilizing the same song title that appears on the album reissue. According to Iggy Pop, "'Asthma Attack' was a structured piece of repetitive descending chording that sounded a lot like (Syd Barrett's) Pink Floyd  'Interstellar Overdrive.'" He elaborates further, "And it was B (major), A (major), G (major), & E (major) like a Who thing – and then I would wheeze and say, 'asthma attack.'"

Ron Asheton's main guitar riff in the song "1969" which utilizes an "A (major) & G (major) two chord guitar pattern was directly lifted from The Byrds "Tribal Gathering" (originally occurring between :50-1:02 & again at 1:30-2:03 mark in the original song arrangement). The drum pattern in "1969" was directly lifted from the famous Bo Diddley percussive beat.

The main guitar riff to "I Wanna Be Your Dog" was inspired by the opening guitar riff to "Highway Chile" by The Jimi Hendrix Experience and the song arrangement to "No Fun" was inspired by Johnny Cash's "I Walk The Line". Embryonic versions of all seven songs were initially written from mid-late 1968 and early 1969. These seven songs were staples—and essentially the basis—of the Stooges' 1968 and early 1969 live set at the time. A typical Stooges song of the period would involve either two minutes of composed song followed by several minutes of improvisation or avant-garde, free-form workouts. Having assumed that the seven songs as normally performed would cover requirements for the album, the Stooges were told by their record label Elektra that they needed more material. Pop later recalled: "We auditioned [the seven-song version of the album] live in the studio and they refused it. Jac Holzman, head of Elektra Records, is quoted having said, 'There aren't enough legitimate songs that contain structured lead vocals!' So we lied and said, 'That's OK, we've got lots more proper songs.' Upon hearing this Holzman then indicated to the band that they had one week to record and prepare the album."

Within the week the group was able to complete the task the label requested and wrote four more songs, "We Will Fall" (based upon a musical chant by Dave Alexander), "Real Cool Time", "Not Right", and "Little Doll" (based upon "Goodbye Bozos" freak out, with an additional opening bass guitar riff directly lifted from Pharoah Sanders "Upper Egypt And Lower Egypt" originally played on stand up bass by Henry Grimes and occurring roughly at the halfway mark (9:03 minute mark) in the original song arrangement. ), and after producer John Cale informed the band that they needed "one more song to complete the album", Iggy revised "Ann" which was the first song he wrote for The Stooges that was initially discarded by the band in 1968.

Three of the four avant-garde, free-form songs were now restructured and edited into pre-existing original songs with only "I'm Sick" being discarded completely for the revised list repertoire of original songs recorded for the album. "The Dance Of Romance" was now added into the composition "Ann" tacked on as a musical coda after the ballad main song piece. "Goodbye Bozos" with an additional two chord sequence and updated lyrics now became revised as "Little Doll", while the Pink Floyd "Interstellar Overdrive" influenced structured piece known as "Asthma Attack" was now jettisoned for a more unstructured freak out piece which was newly improvised yet retained the original song title.

All restructured and edited compositions were now played and recorded for the first time in the studio. An initial mix by John Cale, apparently resembling ex-Velvet Underground bandmate Lou Reed's "closet mix" of that band's eponymous third album from the same year, was rejected by Elektra. The mix as heard on the final product was done by Iggy Pop and Elektra president Jac Holzman. Four of Cale's original mixes would later appear on the bonus disc of a 2005 reissued version, with pitch correction applied to them. Five years later, all eight Cale mixes were released unaltered on the first disc of a 2010 collector's edition release of the album.

Reception and legacy 

According to music historian Denise Sullivan, The Stooges was "disavowed" by most critics; Sullivan nonetheless called it "a rock'n'roll classic". In a contemporary review, Edmund O. Ward of Rolling Stone called it "loud, boring, tasteless, unimaginative and childish", while conceding that he "kind of liked it". Robert Christgau gave it a backhanded compliment in his column for The Village Voice, deeming it "stupid-rock at its best", but did give it a "B+" grade overall.

In retrospect, Will Hodgkinson called The Stooges "charged and brutal garage-rock", and Pitchfork critic Joe Tangari said it was one of the essential forerunners to the punk rock movement of the 1970s. It and the Stooges' next two albums were later deemed "proto-punk landmarks", according to Mojo journalist Manish Agarwal. Daryl Easlea, writing for BBC Music, called the album "rock at its most primordial. ... [the] album is the original punk rock rush on record, a long-held well-kept secret by those in the know." Mark Deming of AllMusic commented, "Part of the fun of The Stooges is, then as now, the band managed the difficult feat of sounding ahead of their time and entirely out of their time, all at once."

In 2003, the album was placed at number 185 on Rolling Stones list of the "500 Greatest Albums of All Time", maintaining the rating in its 2012 revised list, and dropping to number 488 in its 2020 list. The magazine also included "1969" in their list of the "100 Greatest Guitar Songs of All Time". Seth Jacobson, writing in 1001 Albums You Must Hear Before You Die, said that the album was "a collection of brilliant curios, which were neither full-on garage rock, nor out-and-out dirge." In 2005, Q magazine placed "I Wanna Be Your Dog" at number 13 in its list of the "100 Greatest Guitar Tracks".

Reissues 
On August 16, 2005, Elektra and Rhino Records jointly re-issued the album as a specially-priced double CD, with a remastered version of the album on disc one and alternate takes on disc two. On May 7, 2010, Rhino again released the album in their "Handmade" series as a collector's package including two CDs, a 7" record and a 7"x7"-sized booklet. The first disc features the main songs, the single version of "I Wanna Be Your Dog", and all original John Cale mixes of the eight songs. The second disc, and both sides of the 7" single, contain the previously unissued "Asthma Attack", a staple of the group's early live shows. 

On November 8, 2019, Rhino released the 50th Anniversary Super Deluxe Edition of the album on digital services and streaming platforms. This “2019 Remaster” version mirrors the contents of the 2010 double-disc set and includes John Cale's rejected mix of the original album, released at the correct speed for the first time.  In 2020, Vinyl Me, Please reissued the album on vinyl using the rejected John Cale mixes. This was the first time the tracks have ever appeared on a vinyl pressing.

Track listing

Personnel 
The Stooges
 Iggy Pop (credited as "Iggy Stooge") – vocals, handclaps
 Dave Alexander – bass guitar, handclaps
 Ron Asheton – guitar, backing vocals, handclaps
 Scott Asheton – drums, handclaps

Additional personnel
 John Cale – piano, sleigh bell on "I Wanna Be Your Dog", viola on "We Will Fall", production

Technical personnel
 Joel Brodsky – sleeve photography
 Danny Fields – liner notes (original album and 1989 CD release only)
 William S. Harvey – sleeve art direction
 Jac Holzman – production supervisor

2005 reissue personnel
 Bill Inglot – remastering
 Ben Edmonds – liner notes
 Dan Hersch – remastering
 Alice Cooper – liner notes

References

Bibliography

External links 
 

Albums produced by John Cale
1969 debut albums
Elektra Records albums
Rhino Records albums
The Stooges albums
Albums with cover art by Joel Brodsky